Baseball was contested at the 1993 Central American and Caribbean Games in Ponce, Puerto Rico.

References
 

1993 Central American and Caribbean Games
1993
1993
Central American and Caribbean Games